The 9th Glover Trophy was a motor race, run to Formula One rules, held on 3 April 1961 at Goodwood Circuit, England. The race was run over 42 laps of the circuit, and was won by British driver John Surtees in a Cooper T53. The event was held on the same day as the 1961 Pau Grand Prix, which compromised the quality of the entry at both meetings.

Results

References
 "The Grand Prix Who's Who", Steve Small, 1995.
 "The Formula One Record Book", John Thompson, 1974.

Glover Trophy
Glover Trophy
20th century in West Sussex
Glover